The year 1890 in architecture involved some significant events.

Buildings and structures

Buildings

 February 3 – Ypsilanti Water Tower, Ypsilanti, Michigan, designed by William R. Coats, is completed.
 March 4 – The Forth Bridge across the Firth of Forth from South Queensferry to North Queensferry in Scotland, designed by Sir John Fowler and Sir Benjamin Baker, is opened.
 May 13 - Parish church of Holy Trinity, Sloane Street, London, designed by J. D. Sedding, is consecrated.
 May 30 – The James A. Garfield Memorial at Lake View Cemetery in Cleveland, Ohio, designed by George W. Keller, is dedicated.
 September 29 – St James's Roman Catholic Church, Spanish Place, Westminster, designed by Edward Goldie, is opened.
 The Arcade in Cleveland, Ohio, designed by John Eisenmann.
 The Demarest Building, a commercial building on Fifth Avenue in New York City, designed by Renwick, Aspinwall & Russell, is completed.
 Edwin Lutyens' first commission, Crooksbury, a country house near Farnham, England, is completed.
 The Second Madison Square Garden, designed by Stanford White, is completed on the site of the first Madison Square Garden.

Awards
 RIBA Royal Gold Medal – John Gibson.
 Grand Prix de Rome, architecture: Emmanuel Pontremoli.

Births
 February 9 – J. J. P. Oud, Dutch architect (died 1963)
 April 17 – Carl Krayl, German architect (died 1947)
 March 20 – Owen Williams, English structural engineer (died 1969)
 May 4 – Ingrid Wallberg, Swedish architect (died 1965)
 July 31 – Louis de Soissons, Canadian-born English architect (died 1962)
 November 23 – El Lissitzky, Russian architect and designer (died 1941)
 Philip Hepworth, English architect (died 1963)

Deaths
 October 20 – Alfred B. Mullett, American architect (born 1834)

References